Addison Collins Jr. (April 17, 1927 – March 14, 1976) was an American French horn player.

Background 
Born in Pine Bluff, Arkansas, Collins was a member of Glenn Miller's Army Air Force band, and Claude Thornhill's orchestra. He later played with Charlie Parker, Gerry Mulligan, and the nonet featured on Miles Davis' Birth of the Cool.

References 

1927 births
1976 deaths
American jazz horn players
20th-century American musicians
United States Army Air Forces personnel of World War II